From the Files of a Respectable Woman (German: Aus den Akten einer anständigen Frau) is a 1920 German silent comedy film directed by Franz Hofer and starring Margit Barnay, Olga Engl and Fred Immler.

The film's sets were designed by the art director Julian Ballenstedt.

Cast
 Margit Barnay as Ingeborg Andersen
 Olga Engl as Olly Andersen, Mutter
 Fred Immler as Preben Andersen
 Ebba Holm as Helga Andersen
 Fritz Beckmann as Herr Erdmann
 Frieda Wrede as Frau Erdmann
 Grete Sens as Tochter Erdmann
 Preben J. Rist as Prosecutor
 Ellen Isenta as Zimmervermieterin
 Hermann Picha as Hausbewohner
 Olaf Storm as Flanke, Privatedetektiv

References

Bibliography
 Grange, William. Cultural Chronicle of the Weimar Republic. Scarecrow Press, 2008.

External links

1920 films
Films of the Weimar Republic
Films directed by Franz Hofer
German silent feature films
1920 comedy films
German comedy films
German black-and-white films
Silent comedy films
1920s German films
1920s German-language films